Greta "Greetje" Lugthart (born 11 December 1934) is a retired Dutch diver. She competed at the 1960 Summer Olympics in the 3 m springboard and finished in 15th place.

References

1934 births
Living people
Dutch female divers
Olympic divers of the Netherlands
Divers at the 1960 Summer Olympics
20th-century Dutch women